Western Zhou was an ancient Chinese state during the Warring States period. Its capital was Henan (河南), located just west of present-day Luoyang, a prefecture-level city in Henan Province.

The Duchy of Western Zhou was established by Prince Jie (王子揭) in 440 BC. After King Kao of Zhou successfully ascended the throne, Prince Jie (aka Duke Huan of Western Zhou), a younger brother of King Kao was given a fief centred on Henan. 

In 367 BC, Duchy of Eastern Zhou won independence from Western Zhou. The two tiny duchies attacked each other. The kings of Zhou had lost almost all political and military power, even their remaining crown land was occupied by the two tiny duchies.

Western Zhou was attacked by Qin in 256 BC, just after King Nan of Zhou plotted with the states of Chu and Yan for a failed joint expedition against Qin.  Duke Wu of Western Zhou surrendered, but was released by the king of Qin. In the same year, both Duke Wu and King Nan died. Qin deposed the last duke of Western Zhou and exiled him to Zhonghu (忠狐, located just northwest of present-day Ruzhou), the duchy was annexed by Qin.

List of Duke of Western Zhou

References

Ancient Chinese states
5th-century BC establishments
3rd-century BC disestablishments
States and territories disestablished in the 3rd century BC
States and territories established in the 5th century BC